Aubrey Peter Walshe (born 1 January 1934) is a Zimbabwean political scientist and a former first-class cricketer.

Walshe was born at Salisbury in Southern Rhodesia in January 1934. He received his primary schooling in South Africa at Johannesburg and his secondary education back in Rhodesia at Bulawayo. He later studied in England at Wadham College at the University of Oxford. While studying at Oxford, he played first-class cricket for Oxford University, making his debut against Gloucestershire at Oxford in 1953. He played first-class cricket for Oxford until 1956, making 46 appearances. Playing as a wicket-keeper, Walshe scored 900 runs at an average of 14.75, with a high score of 77. Behind the stumps he took 48 catches and made 12 stumpings.

After gaining his doctorate from St Anthony's College, Oxford where he was also an Oppenheimer fellow, he returned to Africa where he lectured at the University of Lesotho from 1959–62. From there he emigrated to the United States, where he became professor of political science at the University of Notre Dame in 1967. Walshe has held fellowships with a number of institutes, including the Helen Kellogg Institute for International Studies and the Joan Kroc Institute for International Peace Studies. He has published a number of books on African politics including black nationalism and liberation movements.

References

External links

1934 births
Living people
People from Harare
Alumni of Wadham College, Oxford
Zimbabwean cricketers
Oxford University cricketers
Alumni of St Antony's College, Oxford
Fellows of St Antony's College, Oxford
Zimbabwean political scientists
Academic staff of the National University of Lesotho
University of Notre Dame faculty
Zimbabwean expatriates in the United States
Women political scientists